Positive pressure personnel suits (PPPS)—or positive pressure protective suits, informally known as "space suits", "moon suits", "blue suits", etc.—are highly specialized, totally encapsulating, industrial protection garments worn only within special biocontainment or maximum containment (BSL-4) laboratory facilities. These facilities research dangerous pathogens which are highly infectious and may have no treatments or vaccines available. These facilities also feature other special equipment and procedures such as airlock entry, quick-drench disinfectant showers, special waste disposal systems, and shower exits.

The PPPS is a sophisticated variety of personal protective equipment (PPE), a type of  hazmat suit, which is air-tight and designed for positive pressure to prevent contamination to the wearer even if the suit becomes damaged. BSL-4 cabinets and "Suit Laboratories" have special engineering and design features to prevent hazardous microorganisms from being disseminated into the outside environment.  These biosafety suites, where PPPSs are used, are suites of laboratory rooms which are essentially equivalent to large Class III biosafety cabinets in which the interiors of the PPPSs serve as the "outside" environment for workers. Examples include the biocontainment suites at the U.S. Army Medical Research Institute of Infectious Diseases (USAMRIID) at Fort Detrick, Maryland and the Maximum Containment Facility (MCF) of the Centers for Disease Control and Prevention (CDC) in Atlanta, Georgia.

Operation

Fresh, filtered air is typically supplied to the interior of a PPPS via overhead tubing. In addition to the physical barrier provided, the positive pressurization offers additional protection in the event of exposure through a defect or puncture in the suit, for if the suit's integrity is compromised, air will be forced out instead of being sucked in. Extensive training with the PPPS is required to safely pursue research in a PPPS within a biosafety facility.

In 1987, USAMRIID scientist Joel Dalrymple described the subjective experience of working in a PPPS and "his solemn respect for working in the hot suits" to a journalist:

History

In the late 1970s, ILC Dover, LP, developed a special garment, the Demilitarization Protective Ensemble (DPE), to fulfill the U.S. Army's need for an off-the-shelf, positive pressure, totally encapsulating suit for use by maintenance personnel at a chemical weapons site.  The DPE was delivered to the Army in 1979 and is still currently in daily use, with over 700 recorded entries into a "hot" environment and a perfect safety record. From the technology used in production of the DPE, ILC developed the Chemturion suit for use in commercial applications. Delta Protection, a subsidiary of French company Bacou-Dalloz, designed a Michelin Man-inspired suit in 2003, known in the United States at that time as French BSL 4 Suit. In July 2007, the CDC purchased 30 Delta Protection suits to be used in BSL-4, and called them "orange suits". On August 20, 2007, Bacou-Dalloz became Sperian Protection. The same suit design became part of Sperian Protection ventilated suits ("White Suits"). On September 15, 2010, Sperian Protection became part of Honeywell. The product is now called Honeywell BSL 4 suits. The Chemturion series is a series of multi-use, totally encapsulating PPPSs, currently used by Public Health Canada, Boston University, AI Signal Research, USAMRIID, the CDC, and many industrial companies such as DuPont, Dow, and Georgia Pacific.

Examples
 The U.S. Army's Demilitarization Protective Ensemble
 The ILC Dover Chemturion "Blue Suit"
 The Delta Protection "Orange Suit"
 The Sperian Protection "White Suit"

In fiction and film

PPPSs — along with many less elaborate types of hazmat suit — have long been a staple of the science fiction and thriller genres, where they are used to accentuate the drama of biohazard scenarios. Common dramatic (and generally unrealistic) situations involve a suit failure leading to rapid death in films such as Outbreak (1995). The wearing of a PPPS can underscore the villainy and "otherness" of movie bad guys as in E.T. the Extra-Terrestrial (1982).  A recent, more sedate, example of PPPSs in a film is the Steven Soderbergh movie Contagion (2011).

In the Mass Effect series of video games, several types of aliens use variants of PPPSs, most notably the character Tali, who has a compromised immune system. In Moebius's comic Edena, the residents of the Nest City wear similar suits at all times to protect themselves from diseases, as do the denizens of Javecek in Carla Speed McNeill's comic Finder. In Bethesda's Fallout games, the Hazmat Suit is an armor item which can be equipped on a character to prevent radiation damage.

References

External links 

Safety clothing
Protective gear
Environmental suits
One-piece suits